Metacosmesis is a genus of moths in the Carposinidae family.

Species
Metacosmesis aelinopa Diakonoff, 1982
Metacosmesis barbaroglypha Diakonoff, 1949
Metacosmesis illodis Diakonoff, 1967
Metacosmesis laxeuta Meyrick, 1906
Metacosmesis xerostola Diakonoff, 1983 (from Saudi-Arabia)

References

Natural History Museum Lepidoptera generic names catalog

Carposinidae